Serhiy Patula (born May 5, 1986) is a Ukrainian footballer.

Career 
Patula began his career in 2004 in the Ukrainian Second League with FC Ros Bila Tserkva. In 2007, he played in the Ukrainian First League with FC Feniks-Illichovets Kalinine, and returned to Bila Tserkva  for the remainder of the season. He returned to the Persha Liha next season to play with FC Sevastopol, and Feniks-Illichovets Kalinine. In 2010, he signed with FC Stal Kamianske, and went abroad in 2017 to play in the Canadian Soccer League with FC Vorkuta.

References 

1986 births
Living people
Ukrainian footballers
FC Ros Bila Tserkva players
FC Feniks-Illichovets Kalinine players
FC Sevastopol players
FC Stal Kamianske players
FC Continentals players
Canadian Soccer League (1998–present) players
Association football midfielders
Ukrainian expatriate footballers
Ukrainian expatriate sportspeople in Canada
Expatriate soccer players in Canada
Ukrainian First League players
Ukrainian Second League players